Ferdinand Charles Gobert, Graf von Aspremont-Lynden-Reckheim (1689–1772), was a soldier, who served in the Low countries for the Habsburgs.

Early life and ancestry
Count Ferdinand Charles Gobert of Aspremont-Lynden-Reckheim was born in Froidcourt Castle, as the youngest son of Count Ferdinand Gobert of Aspremont-Lynden-Reckheim and his second wife, Princess Julianna Barbara Rákóczi, daughter of Francis II Rákóczi, Prince of Transylvania.

Marriages
on 2 January 1730 in Vienna he married for the first time. The bride was Countess Maria Theresia Esterhazy von Galantha (1697–1746), daughter of Prince Michael Esterhazy von Galantha (1671-1721) and his wife, Donna Anna Margherita Tizzone Biandrata (1673-1755). 

After his first wife died, on 2 December 1750 he married for the second time. This time the bride was Countess Maria Johanna Barbara von Nostitz-Rokitnitz (1723–1779), widow of Count Karl Joseph Leopold von Lichnowsky-Woschütz (1702-1739), daughter of Count Johann Karl Martin Christoph von Nostitz-Rokitnitz (1673-1740) and his wife, Countess Maria Maximiliane von Sinzendorf (1675-1718). 

He had no issue from both marriages.

Career
He served the Dutch Republic in the War of Spanish Succession as lieutenant between 1708 and 1714. During this war, he met Prince Eugene of Savoy, and entered in his service in the Imperial Army in 1722.

He fought the French on the Rhine and Moselle between 1733 and 1734, and the Turks between 1737 and 1738. In 1741, he became Feldmarschalleutnant.

During the War of the Austrian Succession in 1743, he was Commandander-in-Chief of the Imperial and Piedmontese armies in Italy. He covered himself in glory, defeating the Franco-Spanish army in the Battle of Campo Santo. He distinguished himself again in the Battle of Velletri (1744) and Battle of Piacenza in 1746.

In 1754, he became Field Marshal, and was also member of the War Council. 
In 1763, he was made a Knight in the Order of the Golden Fleece.

See also 
Castle of Aspremont-Lynden

Sources
 Charles-Alexandre de Lorraine. L'homme, le maréchal, le grand maître, notice by Georges Englebert, ed. Luc Derloo, Brussels, Générale de Banque, 1987, pp. 174–175

External links
 Biographie Nationale de Belgique, vol 1 (fr.wikisource.org)

1689 births
1772 deaths
Field marshals of Austria
Belgian nobility
Knights of the Golden Fleece
Austrian military personnel of the War of the Austrian Succession
Counts of Belgium
Counts of the Netherlands
Belgian Roman Catholics
People from Lanaken